Titus Lake is an alpine lake in Blaine County, Idaho, United States, located in the Smoky Mountains in Sawtooth National Recreation Area of Sawtooth National Forest. The lake is most easily accessed via a trail from just below Galena Summit on Idaho State Highway 75.

References

Lakes of Idaho
Lakes of Blaine County, Idaho
Glacial lakes of the United States
Glacial lakes of the Sawtooth National Forest